The Alborz range, also spelled as Alburz, Elburz or Elborz, is a mountain range in northern Iran that stretches from the border of Azerbaijan along the western and entire southern coast of the Caspian Sea and finally runs northeast and merges into the smaller Aladagh Mountains and borders in the northeast on the parallel mountain ridge Kopet Dag in the northern parts of Khorasan. All these mountains are part of the much larger Alpide belt. This mountain range is divided into the Western, Central, and Eastern Alborz Mountains. The Western Alborz Range (usually called the Talysh) runs south-southeastward almost along the western coast of the Caspian Sea. The Central Alborz (the Alborz Mountains in the strictest sense) runs from west to east along the entire southern coast of the Caspian Sea, while the Eastern Alborz Range runs in a northeasterly direction, toward the northern parts of the Khorasan region, southeast of the Caspian Sea. Mount Damavand, the highest mountain in Iran measuring 5,610.0 m (18,405.5 ft), is located in the Central Alborz Mountains.

Etymology
The name Alborz is derived from Harā Barazaitī, a legendary mountain in the Avesta, the main text of Zoroastrianism. Harā Barazaitī is from a  Proto-Iranian name, Harā Bṛzatī, meaning "Mountain Rampart." Bṛzatī is the feminine form of the adjective bṛzant- "high", the ancestor of modern Persian bouland and BarzBerazandeh, cognate with Sanskrit Brihat. Harā may be interpreted as "watch" or "guard", from an Indo-European root *ser- "protect". In Middle Persian, Harā Barazaitī became Harborz, Modern Persian Alborz, which is a cognate with Elbrus, the highest peak of the Caucasus.

Mythology
Zoroastrians seem to identify the range with the dwelling place of the Peshyotan, and the Zoroastrian Ilm-e-Kshnoom sect identifies Mount Davamand as the home of the Saheb-e-Dilan ('Masters of the Heart'). In his epic Shahnameh, the poet Ferdowsi speaks of the mountains "as though they lay in India." This could reflect older usage, for numerous high peaks were given the name, and some even reflect it to this day, including Mount Elbrus in the Caucasus Mountains and Mount Elbariz (Albariz, Jebal Barez) in the Kerman area above the Strait of Hormuz. All these names reflect the same Iranian language compound, and have been speculatively identified, at one time or another, as the legendary mountain Hara Berezaiti of the Avesta.

Geology

The Alborz mountain range forms a barrier between the south Caspian and the Iranian plateau. It is only 60–130 km wide and consists of sedimentary series dating from Upper Devonian to Oligocene, prevalently Jurassic limestone over a granite core. Continental conditions regarding sedimentation are reflected by thick Devonian sandstones and by Jurassic shales containing coal seams. Marine conditions are reflected by Carboniferous and Permian strata that are composed mainly of limestones. In the Eastern Alborz Range, the far eastern section is formed by Mesozoic (chiefly Triassic and Jurassic) rocks, while the western part of the Eastern Alborz Range is made primarily of Paleozoic rocks. Precambrian rocks can be found chiefly south of the city of Gorgan situated in the southeast of the Caspian Sea and, in much smaller amounts, in the central and western parts of the Central Alborz Range. The central part of the Central Alborz Range is formed mainly of Triassic and Jurassic rocks, while the northwestern section of the range is mainly composed of Jurassic rocks. Very thick beds of Tertiary (mostly Eocene) green volcanic tuffs and lavas are found mainly in the southwestern and south-central parts of the range. The far northwestern part of the Alborz, that constitutes the Western Alborz Range or the Talish Mountains, is mainly made up of Upper Cretaceous volcano-sedimentary deposits, with a strip of Paleozoic rocks and a band of Triassic and Jurassic rocks in the southern parts, both in a northwest–southeast direction. As the Tethys Sea was closed and the Arabian Plate collided with the Iranian Plate, and was pushed against it, and with the clockwise movement of the Eurasian Plate towards the Iranian Plate and their final collision, the Iranian Plate was pressed from both sides. The collisions finally caused the folding of the Upper Paleozoic, Mesozoic, and Paleogene rocks and the Cenozoic (chiefly the Eocene) volcanism, to form the Alborz Mountains, primarily during the Miocene. The Alpine orogeny began, therefore, with Eocene volcanism in southwestern and south-central parts of the Alborz, and continued with the uplift and folding of the older sedimentary rocks in the northwestern, central and eastern parts of the range, during the most important orogenic phases, which date from the Miocene and Pliocene epochs.

Ecoregions, flora and fauna

While the southern slopes of the Alborz Mountains are usually semiarid or arid, with irregular and low precipitation, the northern slopes of the range are usually humid, especially in the western parts of the Central Alborz. In the southern slopes or the Elburz Range forest steppe ecoregion, the higher elevations are arid with few trees. Juniper is the most common tree in inaccessible areas and at high elevation, while common shrubs are pistachio, maple, and almond. But in the northern slopes, the Caspian Hyrcanian mixed forests ecoregion is lush and forested. The natural vegetation of this region grows in distinct zones: 

 Hyrcanian forests on the lowest levels, 
 beech forests in the middle zone, 
 oak forests in higher regions. 

The wild cypress is the dominant form of vegetation in some valleys, while olive trees grow in the western valleys of the Central Alborz near the Sefidrud. The bezoar ibex, Blanford's fox, Rüppell's fox, red fox, Persian fallow deer, wild boar, Syrian brown bear, Persian leopard, Indian wolf, buzzard, goose, woodpecker, griffon vulture, and eagle are among important animals and birds found in the Alborz Mountains. The extinct Caspian tiger also lived in the Alborz Mountains.

Prehistory
Archaeological evidence from Alborz indicates that early human groups were present in the region since at least late Lower Paleolithic. The Darband Cave located at the Gilan Province contains evidence for late Lower Paleolithic. Stone artifacts and animal fossils were discovered by a group of archaeologists of the Department of Paleolithic of the National Museum of Iran and ICHTO of Gilan. The presence of large numbers of cave bear and brown bear remains and sparse stone artifacts at the site indicates that Darband primarily represents a bear den. The co-occurrence of artifacts and bear bones does not imply human predation or scavenging. Because there are no clear cut marks, except a few burning signs on the bear bones, they probably accumulated through natural processes. During Middle Paleolithic period, Neanderthals were most probably were present in the region as their fossil have been found at northwest of Alborz, in the Azykh Cave. Their stone tools found in the Buzeir Cave and Kiaram cave and number of other surveyed sites. Evidence for Modern human comes from a river side site called Garm Roud in the Mazandaran Province which dates back to about 30,000 years ago.

Ski resorts
Due to the great snowy winters of the Alborz Mountains, there are several ski resorts in different places of the range. Some of them, according to ski enthusiasts, are among the best in the world. Some of most important are Dizin, Shemshak, Tochal, and Darbandsar.

Mounts, summits, alpine lakes and attractions
 Mount Damavand Amol Mazandaran
 Tochal mount and summit
 Tangeh Savashi, a popular attraction
 Alam Kuh, a mountain in Alborz mountain range
 Alamut
 Dizin
 Ovan lake

See also
 List of Iranian four-thousanders
 List of mountains in Iran
 Kayanian dynasty
 Koh e Alborz

Sources
 North, S.J.R., Guide to Biblical Iran, Rome 1956, p. 50

References

External links

 Alborz Mountains, Photos from Iran, Livius.
 Maps, Photos and a List of peaks
 

 
Mountain ranges of Iran
Caspian Sea
Iranian Plateau
Landforms of Alborz Province
Landforms of Ardabil Province
Landforms of Gilan Province
Landforms of Golestan Province
Mountains of Mazandaran Province
Landforms of Semnan Province
Landforms of Tehran Province
Tourist attractions in Gilan Province
Tourist attractions in Mazandaran Province
Physiographic provinces
Mountains of Iran